Freak of Nature is a 2001 album by Anastacia.

Freak(s) of Nature may also refer to:

 A freak (an aberration or abnormality)
 Freak of Nature (band), an American hard rock band
 Freak of Nature (Freak of Nature album), 1993
 "Freak of Nature", a song by Chris Crocker from The First Bite
 "Freak of Nature", a song by Mark Ronson and Dodgr from Spies in Disguise
 Freaks of Nature (Drain STH album), 1999
 Freaks of Nature (Kansas album), 1995
 Freaks of Nature, a 2012 concert tour by Kaskade
 Freaks of Nature (film), a 2015 film

See also
 Freak (disambiguation)
 Nature (disambiguation)